Que vueltas da la Vida is the third studio album recorded by Mexican singer-songwriter Reyli Barba. This album was released by Sony Music Latin on 9 June 2009.

Track listing

References

External links
Hear the full album at AOL Music

2009 albums
Reyli albums